Justin Michael Gaston (born August 12, 1988) is an American singer-songwriter, model, and actor who was also a contestant on Nashville Star on season 6. He finished 10th overall out of 12 contestants. He portrayed the role of Ben Rogers on Days of Our Lives for less than four months in 2014. He appeared on the magazine cover of Tetu in 2013.

Career
In 2006, Justin Gaston left his hometown of Pineville, Louisiana, to pursue a career in acting. Gaston first worked as an underwear model for Christian Audigier, Adidas, International Jock, and Hugo Boss.

Gaston appeared as Taylor Swift's love interest on her 2008 music video for "Love Story", and also appeared on the pilot episode of the television series Glee, which premiered on the Fox network on May 19, 2009.

In February 2010, Gaston began appearing on Simon Fuller's interactive reality show, the If I Can Dream webseries, which aired on Hulu. The show provided round-the-clock coverage of the daily lives of five aspiring stars who had moved into a house in Hollywood, California. Gaston's costars were Ben Elliott, Giglianne Braga, Kara Killmer, and Amanda Phillips.

On April 14, 2010, Gaston performed a duet on Simon Fuller's American Idol with Brooke White, the fifth place finalist on season 7. Gaston's song choice was the Elvis Presley ballad, "If I Can Dream".

During the summer of 2010, Gaston was a temporary opening act for American Idol winner Kris Allen.

On February 6, 2014, it was announced that Gaston joined the cast of the soap opera Days of Our Lives. He played the role of Jordan Ridgeway's brother, Ben Rogers, making his first appearance on February 27. After four months, he was let go from the role, and was replaced by former All My Children actor Robert Scott Wilson.

In November 2020, it was announced Gaston had been temporarily cast in the role of Chance Chancellor on The Young and the Restless.

Personal life

Gaston was born in Pineville, Louisiana. He attended Pineville High School. He competed in track and field, finishing sixth in the pole vault at the 2005 Louisiana High School Athletic Association (LHSAA) 4A State Championship meet. Gaston achieved a height of 12' 6" in the competition.

Gaston married actress Melissa Ordway on September 22, 2012. In 2016, Gaston and Ordway adopted their first child, a daughter they named Olivia Christine, born in April 2016. Ordway gave birth to their second daughter, Sophie Jolie, on December 9, 2017.

Filmography

See also
 List of male underwear models

References

External links

1988 births
Living people
People from Pineville, Louisiana
Pineville High School (Louisiana) alumni
American male film actors
American male television actors
Male models from Louisiana
American pop guitarists
Nashville Star contestants
American male guitarists
21st-century American singers
21st-century American male singers